Neumühler See is a lake in Mecklenburg-Vorpommern, Germany. At an elevation of 44 m, its surface area is 1.715 km².

External links 
 

Lakes of Mecklenburg-Western Pomerania